Ulospongiella is a genus of sponge known only from the Burgess Shale deposit. It contains only one species, Ulospongiella ancyla.

The generic name is derived from the Greek words oulus ("wooly" or "curly") and spongia ("sponge"), referring to the curled or curved spicules forming the skeleton. The specific name, ancyla, is from the Greek ankylos ("bent" or "hooked"), also referring to the curved spicules.

References

External links
 

Burgess Shale sponges
Monotypic sponge genera
Prehistoric sponge genera
Protomonaxonida

Cambrian genus extinctions